The Fraunhofer Society is a German research organization with 76institutes spread throughout Germany, each focusing on different fields of applied science (as opposed to the Max Planck Society, which works primarily on basic science). With some 29,000 employees, mainly scientists and engineers, and with an annual research budget of about €2.8billion, it is the biggest organization for applied research and development services in Europe.

Some basic funding for the Fraunhofer Society is provided by the state (the German public, through the federal government together with the states or Länder, "owns" the Fraunhofer Society), but more than 70% of the funding is earned through contract work, either for government-sponsored projects or from industry.

It is named after Joseph von Fraunhofer who, as a scientist, an engineer, and an entrepreneur, is said to have superbly exemplified the goals of the society. The organization has seven centers in the United States, under the name "Fraunhofer USA", and three in Asia. In October 2010, Fraunhofer announced that it would open its first research center in South America.
Fraunhofer UK Research Ltd was established as a legally independent affiliate along with its Fraunhofer Centre for Applied Photonics, in Glasgow, Scotland, in March 2012.

Fraunhofer model 
The so-called "Fraunhofer model" has been in existence since 1973 and has led to the society's continuing growth. Under the model, the Fraunhofer Society earns about 70% of its income through contracts with industry or specific government projects. The other 30% of the budget is sourced in the proportion 9:1 from federal and state (Land) government grants and is used to support preparatory research.

Thus the size of the society's budget depends largely on its success in maximizing revenue from commissions. This funding model applies not just to the central society itself but also to the individual institutes. This serves both to drive the realization of the Fraunhofer Society's strategic direction of becoming a leader in applied research and to encourage a flexible, autonomous, and entrepreneurial approach to the society's research priorities.

The institutes are not legally independent units. The Fraunhofer model grants a very high degree of independence to the institutes in terms of project results, scientific impact and above all for their own funding. On the one hand, this results in a high degree of independence in terms of technical focus, distribution of resources, project acquisition, and project management. On the other hand, this also generates a certain economic pressure and a compulsion to customer and market orientation. In this sense, the institutes and their employees act in an entrepreneurial manner and ideally combine research, innovation, and entrepreneurship.

Numerous innovations are the result of research and development work at the Fraunhofer institutes. The institutes work on practically all application-relevant technology fields, i.e. microelectronics, information and communication technology, life sciences, materials research, energy technology or medical technology. One of the best known Fraunhofer developments is the MP3 audio data compression process. In 2018, the Fraunhofer-Gesellschaft reported 734 new inventions. This corresponds to about three inventions per working day. Of these, 612 developments were registered for patents. The number of active property rights and property right applications increased to 6881.

Institutes
The Fraunhofer Society currently operates 76 institutes and research units. These are Fraunhofer Institutes for:
 Advanced Systems Engineering – IEM
 Algorithms and Scientific Computing – SCAI
 Applied Information Technology – FIT
 Applied and Integrated Security – AISEC
 Applied Optics and Precision Engineering – IOF 
 Applied Polymer Research – IAP
 Applied Solid State Physics – IAF
 Biomedical Engineering – IBMT
 Building Physics – IBP
 Cell Therapy and Immunology - IZI
 Ceramic Technologies and Systems – IKTS
 Chemical Technology – ICT
 Communication, Information Processing and Ergonomics – FKIE
 Computer Graphics Research – IGD
 Digital Media Technology – IDMT
 Digital Medicine - MEVIS
 Electron Beam and Plasma Technology – FEP
 Electronic Nano Systems – ENAS
 Energy Economics and Energy System Technology - IEE
 Environmental, Safety and Energy Technology – UMSICHT
 Embedded Systems and Communication - ESK
 Experimental Software Engineering – IESE
 Factory Operation and Automation – IFF
 High-Frequency Physics and Radar Techniques – FHR
 High-Speed Dynamics (Ernst-Mach-Institut) – EMI
 Industrial Engineering – IAO
 Industrial Mathematics – ITWM
 Information Center for Regional Planning and Building Construction – IRB
 Integrated Circuits – IIS
 Integrated Systems and Device Technology – IISB
 Intelligent Analysis and Information Systems – IAIS
 Interfacial Engineering and Biotechnology – IGB
 International Management and Knowledge Economy - IMW
 Laser Technology – ILT
 Machine Tools and Forming Technology – IWU
 Manufacturing Engineering and Applied Materials Research  – IFAM
 Manufacturing Engineering and Automation – IPA
 Material and Beam Technology – IWS
 Material Flow and Logistics – IML
 Materials Recycling and Resource Strategies – IWKS
 Mechanics of Materials – IWM
 Microelectronic Circuits and Systems – IMS
 Microstructure of Materials and Systems – IMWS
 Microsystems and Solid State Technologies EMFT - EMFT
 Molecular Biology and Applied Ecology – IME
 Non-Destructive Testing – IZFP
 Optronics, System Technologies and Image Exploitation – IOSB
 Open Communication Systems – FOKUS
 Photonic Microsystems – IPMS
 Physical Measurement Techniques – IPM
 Process Engineering and Packaging – IVV
 Production Systems and Design Technology – IPK
 Production Technology – IPT
 Reliability and Microintegration – IZM
 Secure Information Technology – SIT
 Silicate Research – ISC
 Silicon Technology – ISIT
 Solar Energy Systems – ISE
 Structural Durability and System Reliability – LBF
 Surface Engineering and Thin Films – IST
 Systems and Innovation Research – ISI
 Technological Trend Analysis – INT
 Telecommunications, Heinrich-Hertz-Institut – HHI 
 Toxicology and Experimental Medicine – ITEM
 Transportation and Infrastructure Systems – IVI
 Wind Energy Systems – IWES
 Wood Research, Wilhelm-Klauditz-Institut – WKI

Fraunhofer USA
In addition to its German institutes, the Fraunhofer Society operates five US-based Centers through its American subsidiary, Fraunhofer USA:
 Coatings and Diamond Technologies – CCD
 Experimental Software Engineering – CESE
 Laser Applications – CLA
 Manufacturing Innovation – CMI
 Digital Media Technologies – DMT

Fraunhofer Singapore
In 2017 Fraunhofer Society launched its first direct subsidiary in Asia:
 Fraunhofer Singapore –  Visual and Medical Computing, Cognitive Human-Machine Interaction, Cyber- and Information Security, Visual Immersive Mathematics

Fraunhofer UK Research Ltd
At the invitation of the UK Government, Fraunhofer UK Research Ltd was established in partnership with the University of Strathclyde. The UK's first Fraunhofer Centre, Fraunhofer Centre for Applied Photonics, was established and quickly recognised as a world-leading centre in lasers and optical systems. The UK Government commented on the significance of Fraunhofer CAP in quantum technology innovation. Ongoing core funding is received from Scottish Government, Scottish Enterprise and the University of Strathclyde.

Notable projects
The MP3 compression algorithm was invented and patented by Fraunhofer IIS. Its license revenues generated about €100 million in revenue for the society in 2005.
The Fraunhofer Heinrich Hertz Institute (HHI) was a significant contributor to the H.264/MPEG-4 AVC video compression standard, a technology recognized with two Emmy awards in 2008 and 2009. This includes the Fraunhofer FDK AAC library.
As of May 2010, a metamorphic triple-junction solar cell developed by Fraunhofer's Institute for Solar Energy Systems holds the world record for solar energy conversion efficiency with 41.1%, nearly twice that of a standard silicon-based cell.
Fraunhofer is developing a program for use at IKEA stores, which would allow people to take a picture of their home into a store to view a fully assembled, digital adaptation of their room.
E-puzzler, a pattern-recognition machine, which can digitally put back together even the most finely shredded papers. The E-puzzler uses a computerized conveyor belt that runs shards of shredded and torn paper through a digital scanner, automatically reconstructing original documents.
OpenIMS, an Open Source implementation of IMS Call Session Control Functions (CSCFs) and a lightweight Home Subscriber Server (HSS), which together form the core elements of all IMS/NGN architectures as specified today within 3GPP, 3GPP2, ETSI TISPAN and the PacketCable initiative.
 Powerpaste, a magnesium- and hydrogen-based gel, that releases hydrogen fuel suitable for fuel cell consumption when it reacts with water has been developed by the Fraunhofer Institute for Manufacturing Technology and Advanced Materials (IFAM).
Roborder, an autonomous border surveillance system that uses unmanned mobile robots including aerial, water surface, underwater and ground vehicles which incorporate multi-modal sensors as part of an interoperable network.

History

The Fraunhofer Society was founded in Munich on March 26, 1949, by representatives of industry and academia, the government of Bavaria, and the nascent Federal Republic.

In 1952, the Federal Ministry for Economic Affairs declared the Fraunhofer Society to be the third part of the non-university German research landscape (alongside the German Research Foundation (DFG) and the Max Planck Institutes). Whether the Fraunhofer Society should support applied research through its own facilities was, however, the subject of a long-running dispute.

From 1954, the Society's first institutes developed. By 1956, it was developing research facilities in cooperation with the Ministry of Defense. In 1959, the Fraunhofer Society comprised nine institutes with 135 coworkers and a budget of 3.6 million Deutsche Mark.

In 1965, the Fraunhofer Society was identified as a sponsor organization for applied research.

In 1968, the Fraunhofer Society became the target of public criticism for its role in military research.

By 1969, Fraunhofer had more than 1,200 employees in 19 institutes. The budget stood at 33 million Deutsche Mark. At this time, a "commission for the promotion of the development of the Fraunhofer Society" planned the further development of the Fraunhofer Society (FhG). The commission developed a financing model that would make the Society dependent on its commercial success. This would later come to be known as the "Fraunhofer Model".

The Model was agreed to by the Federal Cabinet and the Bund-Länder-Kommission in 1973. In the same year, the executive committee and central administration moved into joint accommodation at Leonrodstraße 54 in Munich.

The Fraunhofer program for the promotion of consulting research for SMEs was established, and has gained ever more significance in subsequent years.

In 1977, the political ownership of the society was shared by the Ministries of Defense and Research.

By 1984, the Fraunhofer Society had 3,500 employees in 33 institutes and a research budget of 360 million Deutsche Mark.

By 1988, defence research represented only about 10% of the entire expenditure of the Fraunhofer Society.

By 1989, the Fraunhofer Society had nearly 6,400 employees in 37 institutes, with a total budget of 700 million Deutsche Mark.

In 1991, the Fraunhofer Society faced the challenge of integrating numerous research establishments in former East Germany as branch offices of already-existing institutes in the Fraunhofer Society.

In 1993, the Fraunhofer Society's total budget exceeded 1 billion Deutsche Mark.

In 1994, the Society founded a US-based subsidiary, Fraunhofer USA, Inc., to extend the outreach of Fraunhofer's R&D network to American clients.

Its mission statement of 2000 committed the Fraunhofer Society to being a market and customer-oriented, nationally and internationally active sponsor organization for institutes of applied research.

In 1999, Fraunhofer initiated Fraunhofer Venture, a technology transfer office, to advance the transfer of its scientific research findings and meet the growing entrepreneurial spirit in the Fraunhofer institutes.

Between 2000 and 2001, the institutes and IT research centres of the GMD (Gesellschaft für Mathematik und Datenverarbeitung – Society for Mathematics and Information technology) were integrated into the Fraunhofer Society at the initiative of the Federal Ministry for Education and Research.

The year 2000 marked a noteworthy success at Fraunhofer-Institut for Integrated Circuits (IIS): MP3, a lossy audio format which they developed.  For many years afterwards, MP3 was the most widely adopted method for compressing and decompressing digital audio.

In 2002, ownership of the Heinrich-Hertz-Institut for Communications Technology Berlin GmbH (HHI), which belonged to the Gottfried William Leibniz Society e. V. (GWL), was transferred to the Fraunhofer Society. With this integration, the Fraunhofer Society budget exceeded €1 billion for the first time.

In 2003, the Fraunhofer Society headquarters moved to its own building in Munich.

The Fraunhofer Society developed and formulated a firm specific mission statement summarizing fundamental targets and codifying the desired "values and guidelines" of the society's "culture". Amongst these, the society committed itself to improving the opportunities for female employees and coworkers to identify themselves with the enterprise and to develop their own creative potential.

In 2004, the former "Fraunhofer Working Group for Electronic Media Technology" at the Fraunhofer-Institut for Integrated Circuits (IIS) gained the status of an independent institute. It becomes Fraunhofer-Institut for Digital Media Technology IDMT.

New alliances and topic groups helped to strengthen the market operational readiness level of the institutes for Fraunhofer in certain jurisdictions.

In 2005, two new institutes, the Leipzig Fraunhofer-Institut for Cell Therapy and Immunology (IZI), and the Fraunhofer Center for Nano-electronic technologies CNT in Dresden, were founded.

In 2006, the Fraunhofer Institute for Intelligent Analysis and Information Systems (IAIS) was founded as a merger between the Institute for Autonomous Intelligent Systems (AIS), and the Institute for Media Communication (IMK).

In 2009, the former FGAN Institutes were converted into Fraunhofer Institutes, amongst them the Fraunhofer Institute for Communication, Information Processing and Ergonomics FKIE and the Fraunhofer Institute for Radar and High Frequency Technology FHR.

In 2012, the cooperation of Fraunhofer with selected research-oriented universities of applied sciences based on the "Application Center" model started. The first cooperation was started with the Technische Hochschule OWL in Lemgo and led to the foundation of the Fraunhofer IOSB-INA in late 2011.

Image gallery

Presidents
Walther Gerlach (1949–1951)
Wilhelm Roelen (1951–1955)
Hermann von Siemens (1955–1964)
Franz Kollmann (1964–1968)
Christian Otto Mohr (1968–1974)
Heinz Keller (1974–1982)
Max Syrbe (1982–1993)
Hans-Jürgen Warnecke (1993–2002)
Hans-Jörg Bullinger (2002–2012)
Reimund Neugebauer (2012–present)

See also
National Network for Manufacturing Innovation
 Open access in Germany

Notes

References

External links 
  
  
  (US)
  (UK)
  (DE) 

 
1949 establishments in West Germany
Engineering research institutes
Laboratories in Germany
Members of the European Research Consortium for Informatics and Mathematics
Organizations established in 1949
Robotics organizations
Scientific organisations based in Germany
20th-century establishments in Bavaria